Gladiatress is a 2004 British comedy film, starring Sally Phillips, Fiona Allen and Doon Mackichan. It is partly a spoof of 2000's Gladiator.

Plot 

Three unlikely heroines Worthaboutapig (Sally Phillips), Dwyfuc (Doon Mackichan) and Smirgut the Fierce (Fiona Allen) set out to thwart a Roman invasion and save Celtic Britain.

Cast 
 Worthaboutapig – Sally Phillips
 Dwyfuc – Doon Mackichan
 Smirgut the Fierce – Fiona Allen
 General Rhinus – David Hayman
 Caesar – Ronan Vibert
 Jean Marcosivellauniviromandiboule – Philippe De Groussouvre
 Dubonet Warrior – Rory MacGregor
 Mrs Goatsplitter – Pam Ferris
 Welsh Suitor – Brendan O'Hea
 Chamberlain – William Chubb

Filming 
It was filmed at various locations in the UK between 11 November and 23 December 2002. Filming locations included the Bourne Woods and Frensham Ponds near Farnham in Surrey, Butser Ancient Farm in Hampshire, and West Wittering in West Sussex.

Critical reception
Total Film gave the DVD release of Gladiatress one star out of five and described the film as "a painfully laugh-free vehicle for the usually talented stars of TV's Smack The Pony".

References

External links 
 
 

2004 films
2000s parody films
British parody films
Fiction set in Roman Britain
Films produced by Graham Broadbent
Films produced by Bruce Davey
Films set in prehistoric Britain
Films set in the 1st century BC
2000s historical comedy films
British historical comedy films
2000s English-language films
2000s British films